Mukhammad Imomaliyevich Sultonov (born 22 December 1992) is a Russian footballer. He plays for FC Rodina Moscow.

Club career
He made his debut in the Russian Second Division for FC Lokomotiv-2 Moscow on 22 April 2012 in a game against FC Volga Tver.

He made his Russian Football National League debut for PFC Spartak Nalchik on 9 March 2014 in a game against FC SKA-Energiya Khabarovsk.

He made his Russian Premier League debut for FC Rotor Volgograd on 11 August 2020 in a game against FC Zenit Saint Petersburg.

On 8 September 2020, his contract with Rotor was terminated by mutual consent. On the next day, he signed a 2-year contract with FC Nizhny Novgorod.

Honours
Torpedo Moscow
 Russian Football National League : 2021-22

Career statistics

References

External links
 
 
 

1992 births
People from Khatlon Region
Tajikistani emigrants to Russia
Living people
Russian footballers
Association football midfielders
PFC CSKA Moscow players
FC Lokomotiv Moscow players
PFC Spartak Nalchik players
FC Tosno players
FC Shinnik Yaroslavl players
FC Rotor Volgograd players
FC Nizhny Novgorod (2015) players
FC Torpedo Moscow players
Russian Second League players
Russian First League players
Russian Premier League players